Cyberman is a 2001 documentary film about Steve Mann, inventor of the EyeTap. It was directed by Peter Lynch, but much of the material in the film was also shot by Mann himself, through his EyeTap. Thus Cyberman may well have been the first film in which the subject incidentally or existentially (i.e. just by being himself) shot much of the material used in the film.

The book Cyborg... was released the same year, and much of the material in the film is based on material in an early draft of the book's manuscript.

Novelist William Gibson appears in the film, in conjunction with Mann's presentation at the TED (Technology Entertainment and Design) conference. Mann and Gibson were both presenters at TED, and the interview takes place immediately following their presentations at the conference.

References

External links
 

2001 films
Canadian documentary films
2001 documentary films
Films directed by Peter Lynch
2000s English-language films
2000s Canadian films
English-language Canadian films
English-language documentary films